Qinngua Valley, also called Qinnquadalen, Kanginsap Qinngua and Paradisdalen, is a valley in Greenland, about  from the nearest settlement of Tasiusaq, Kujalleq. The lake drains into Tasermiut Fjord.

In total, over 300 species of plants grow in the valley. Growing sometimes to tree height is the Greenland mountain ash (Sorbus groenlandica), which is usually a shrub. Green alder (Alnus crispa) is also found in the valley.

It is possible that other forests of this type once existed in Greenland but were cleared by early settlers for firewood or building material. The valley was declared a protected natural area in 1930.

Although nearly all of ice-free Greenland has an Arctic tundra climate (ET in the Köppen climate classification), Qinngua Valley may have a sub-arctic Dfc climate.

References

Valleys of Greenland
Flora of Greenland
Forests of Denmark
Forests of North America